Benjamín Galindo Cruz (born 10 March 1999) is a Mexican professional footballer who plays as a centre-back for Liga de Expansión MX club Cancún.

Club career

Guadalajara
Galindo debuted as a starter in his first Liga MX match against Veracruz on 7 April 2018.

Personal life
Galindo is the son of the Mexican footballer manager and former midfielder with the same name, Benjamín Galindo Sr.

Honours
Guadalajara
CONCACAF Champions League: 2018

References

External links
Debut Benjamin Galindo Jr

1999 births
Living people
Mexican footballers
Mexican expatriate footballers
Association football defenders
C.D. Guadalajara footballers
Reno 1868 FC players
Liga MX players
Tercera División de México players
USL Championship players
Mexican expatriate sportspeople in the United States
Expatriate soccer players in the United States
Footballers from Mexico City